The 2021 Amex-Istanbul Challenger II was a professional tennis tournament played on hard courts. It was the 35th edition of the tournament which was part of the 2021 ATP Challenger Tour. It took place in Istanbul, Turkey between 13 and 19 September 2021.

Singles main-draw entrants

Seeds

 1 Rankings are as of 30 August 2021.

Other entrants
The following players received wildcards into the singles main draw: 
  Sarp Ağabigün
  Victor Vlad Cornea
  Koray Kırcı

The following players received entry from the qualifying draw:
  Nick Chappell
  Christopher Heyman
  Laurent Lokoli
  Aldin Šetkić

The following player received entry as a lucky loser:
  Geoffrey Blancaneaux

Champions

Singles

  James Duckworth def.  Wu Tung-lin 6–4, 6–2.

Doubles

  Radu Albot /  Alexander Cozbinov def.  Antonio Šančić /  Artem Sitak 4–6, 7–5, [11–9].

References

2021 ATP Challenger Tour
2021
2021 in Turkish tennis
September 2021 sports events in Turkey